The Namaqua stream frog (Strongylopus springbokensis) is a species of frog in the family Pyxicephalidae found in South Africa and possibly Namibia. Its natural habitats are subtropical or tropical dry shrubland, Mediterranean-type shrubby vegetation, rivers, freshwater marshes, and intermittent freshwater marshes.
It is threatened by habitat loss.

References

Strongylopus
Amphibians of South Africa
Amphibians described in 1986
Taxonomy articles created by Polbot